The 2021 Grand Prix La Marseillaise was the 42nd edition of the Grand Prix La Marseillaise cycle race. It was held on 31 January 2021 as a category 1.1 race on the 2021 UCI Europe Tour and the first event of the 2021 French Road Cycling Cup.

Defending champion Benoît Cosnefroy of  suffered a knee injury in training in mid-January and was forced to miss the race, but his teammate and French compatriot Aurélien Paret-Peintre won the race. The peloton was reduced to a small group of around 30 riders at the finish, and in the ensuing bunch sprint, Paret-Peintre, not generally known for his sprinting prowess, narrowly beat sprinters Thomas Boudat and Bryan Coquard in a photo finish.

Teams
Seven UCI WorldTeams, eight UCI ProTeams, and two UCI Continental teams make up the seventeen teams that were invited to the race. Each team entered with seven riders, making up a 119-rider peloton. Of these riders, there were 110 finishers. Four riders finished over the time limit, while a further four did not finish the race.

UCI WorldTeams

 
 
 
 
 
 
 

UCI ProTeams

 
 
 
 
 
 
 
 

UCI Continental Teams

Result

References

Grand Prix La Marseillaise
Grand Prix La Marseillaise
2021
Grand Prix La Marseillaise